Burnhamia is an extinct genus of devil ray from the Paleogene period. Due to superficial similarities, some species were originally mistaken for Cow-nose rays and placed in the genus Rhinoptera. It is known exclusively from dental batteries, mostly isolated teeth. There are several species attributed to this genus but their relation to each other is still unresolved. Some have proposed the type species B. daviesi arises in the late Paleocene and persists until the middle Eocene giving rise to the similar genus Eoplinthicus with an earlier offshoot leading to smaller and less ornamented species in the lower Eocene, namely B. fetahi. B. fetahi is known from Morocco and North America. B. daviesi was described from the London Clay Formation, but is well known from Eocene deposits throughout Asia, Europe, North Africa, and North America. However, teeth from the Claiborne Group of Alabama show teeth identical to B. daviesi coexisting with Eoplinthicus in the Bartonian. A Ypresian species, B. nessovi, known from a singular site in Kazakhstan was tentatively ascribed to the genus, though more material may show it warrant its own. B. crimensis is known from the Bartonian and Priabonian of Crimea.

References

Myliobatiformes
Ray genera